Santiago Buitrago Sánchez (born 26 September 1999) is a Colombian racing cyclist, who currently rides for UCI WorldTeam . In October 2020, he was named in the startlist for the 2020 Vuelta a España.

Major results
2019
 6th Overall Giro della Valle d'Aosta
 9th GP Capodarco
2021
 1st  Mountains classification, Settimana Ciclistica Italiana
 3rd Circuito de Getxo
 8th Overall Vuelta a Burgos
 10th Overall Tour de Hongrie
2022
 1st Stage 17 Giro d'Italia 
 2nd Overall Saudi Tour
1st Stage 2
 8th Overall Tour of the Alps
 8th Overall Vuelta a Burgos
1st Stage 1
2023
 3rd Overall Saudi Tour
1st  Young rider classification
 3rd Overall Vuelta a Andalucía

Grand Tour general classification results timeline

References

External links

1999 births
Living people
Colombian male cyclists
Colombian Giro d'Italia stage winners
Sportspeople from Bogotá
21st-century Colombian people